Na Kasem  is a tambon (subdistrict) located in the easternmost area of Thung Si Udom district, in Ubon Ratchathani Province, Thailand. In 2021, it had a population of 6,106 people. Neighbouring subdistricts are (clockwise from the south) Kut Ruea, Khok Chamrae, Som Sa-at, Non Sombun, and Kaeng.

History
The area was settled by a group of villagers evacuated from Sisaket province; the first settlement was named "Kan Tuan" (กันต๊วน) but was later renamed "Na Kasem" after obtaining subdistrict status in 1979.

The tambon was founded by incorporating seven settlements in the northern part of Kaeng in the Det Udom district.  Later in 1992, tambon Na Kasem, together with four other subdistricts, including Thung Thoeng, Khok Chamrae, Nong Om, and Kut Ruea, were split off from Det Udom district to create a minor district (king amphoe) called Thung Si Udom. However, the inclusion of tambon Thung Thoeng into the new district was undone a year later, on June 1.

Geography
The tambon is located in the northern region of the Thung Si Udom district, on the river plains of the Chamrae Creek (ห้วยชำแระ), one of the tributaries of the Lam Dom Yai River (ลำโดมใหญ่).

Administration
The Na Kasem subdistrict is divided into 10 administrative villages (mubans; หมู่บ้าน), one of which, Na Kasem village, was further divided into two community groups (Mu; หมู่). The entire area is governed by the Subdistrict Administrative Organization of Na Kasem (องค์การบริหารส่วนตำบลนาเกษม; Na Kasem SAO).

As of the 2021 census, it had a population of 6,106 people with 1,918 households. The following is a list of the subdistrict's mubans, which roughly correspond to the villages.

References

Tambon of Ubon Ratchathani Province